"We Take the Chance" is a single by the German synthpop duo Modern Talking, released in 1998 as a single.

It's the double-A-side along with a megamix with all of their 1980s hit singles, named Space Mix '98, with Eric Singleton.

The song was used as the Nationalist Party's anthem for the 1998 Malta elections. "We Take the Chance" samples Europe's song "The Final Countdown".

Track listing 
CD Single 74321 62737 2
 "Space Mix '98" (feat. Eric Singleton) - 4:28
 "We Take The Chance" - 4:07

Credits 
 We Take The Chance published by Blue Obsession Music/Warner/Chappell Music

References

External links

1998 singles
Modern Talking songs
Songs written by Dieter Bohlen
Hansa Records singles
1998 songs
Eurodance songs
Song recordings produced by Dieter Bohlen